Clinidium kochalkai is a species of ground beetle in the subfamily Rhysodinae. It was described by R.T. Bell & J.R. Bell in 1985. It is named for arachnologist John A. Kochalka, friend and former student of the Bells. Clinidium kochalkai is known from Sierra Nevada de Santa Marta, Colombia. It measures  in length.

References

Clinidium
Beetles of South America
Arthropods of Colombia
Endemic fauna of Colombia
Beetles described in 1985